Margaret of England (15 March 1275 – after 1333) was the tenth child and seventh daughter of King Edward I of England and his first wife, Eleanor of Castile. Her husband was John II, Duke of Brabant, whom she married in 1290, the year of her mother's death. Margaret and John had one child, John III, Duke of Brabant.

Early life
Margaret was born on 15 March 1275, at Windsor Castle, the tenth child of King Edward I and his cousin Eleanor of Castile.

Margaret's fifteen siblings included Joan of Acre, Eleanor, Countess of Bar, Elizabeth of Rhuddlan and her father's successor, Edward II of England.

Duchess of Brabant
On 8 July 1290 Margaret married John II, Duke of Brabant in Westminster Abbey, London, becoming Duchess of Brabant less than four years later on 3 May 1294. She had been acquainted with her groom since childhood, as they had been betrothed in 1278 when she was three years old. Margaret's wedding festivities were splendidly extravagant; they included a procession of knights in full body armour and richly dressed ladies singing as they paraded through the streets of London to the music provided by harpers, minstrels and violinists, while fools danced. Their only child was John III, Duke of Brabant, successor to his father.

Margaret, described as having been a good-natured, merry child in her youth, was unhappy at the Brabant court, as she was forced to accept her husband's perennial succession of mistresses and the illegitimate children they bore him, all of whom were raised at court alongside her own son John. The latter was her only child, born 10 years into her marriage to the Duke.

During the reign of John II, Brabant continued supporting a coalition to stop French expansion. He tried to conquer South Holland from the pro-French count John II of Holland, but was not successful. John, who suffered from kidney stones and wanted his duchy to be peacefully handed over to his son upon his death, in 1312 signed the famous Charter of Kortenberg.

Margaret and John attended the wedding of her brother Edward to Isabella of France in Boulogne on 25 January 1308. They accompanied the royal pair to England for their joint coronation at Westminster Abbey the following month.

Death
Margaret died twenty-two years after her husband. She died in Brabant and was buried at the Cathedral of St. Michael and St. Gudula, Brussels. She was the longest-living and last surviving of Edward I's nineteen children, dying in the reign of her nephew Edward III of England. Her tomb and that of her husband have been destroyed.

Ancestry

References

1275 births
14th-century deaths
13th-century English people
14th-century English people
13th-century English women
14th-century English women
English princesses
Margaret Plantagenet
Burials at the Cathedral of St. Michael and St. Gudula
Duchesses of Brabant
Duchesses of Limburg
Daughters of kings
Children of Edward I of England